Persephone Books is an independent publisher based in Bath, England. Founded in 1999 by Nicola Beauman, Persephone Books reprints works largely by women writers of the late 19th and 20th century, though a few books by men are included. The catalogue includes fiction (novels and short stories) and non-fiction (diaries, memoirs and cookery books). Most books have a grey dustjacket and endpaper using a contemporaneous design, with a matching bookmark. 

The company sells books mostly through its website, but also maintains a shop in Bath.

History
Persephone Books was founded as a mail-order publisher in the spring of 1999 by writer Nicola Beauman, after she received a small inheritance from her father. Beauman named the company Persephone after the Greek goddess connected with spring who is "both 'victim and mistress'". Beauman wanted to upend the devaluing of women writers in literary culture and to restore previously lost works to the canon. She was inspired by Virago Press, which had published her first book A Very Great Profession: The Woman's Novel 1914–39, and its commitment to reprinting lost classics of women's literature.

The company's first offices were in Clerkenwell, London. Sales at first were modest, but its 2000 reprint of Miss Pettigrew Lives for a Day, the publisher's 21st book, became a bestseller with over 100,000 sales by 2012. The success of Miss Pettigrew allowed the company to set up a new shop in Lamb's Conduit Street in Bloomsbury, where it remained for two decades. In May 2021 the Bloomsbury shop was closed and the company moved to Edgar Buildings in Bath.

Publications

Most of Persephone's publications are issued in a uniform grey colour, with endpapers that reproduce prints or patterns from the year of the book's first printing. For example, the They Knew Mr. Knight endpapers represent an industrial town in dark colours, reflecting the theme of the title. Each book is typeset in ITC Baskerville. The design was inspired by the simplicity of 1930s Penguin Books and the design of French publications. 

Most titles in the catalogue were written by women in the early or mid 20th century and focus on representations of the home. In this way, Persephone combines both modernism and feminist literature. The catalogue is described as containing "the type of books where very quiet things happen in very dramatic ways to perfectly normal people without anyone thinking twice about it." In some cases, the publisher has actually adopted the label of "middlebrow" for combining both a literary sensitivity and a desire for driving plot in its book selections. Books on cooking, memoirs, and collected letters are also included.

Persephone Books also publishes the Persephone Biannually (once the Persephone Quarterly) magazine for subscribers, which includes articles on its newest publications.

Authors

Authors published by Persephone Books include:

See also
 Feminist bookstores
 Domesticity
 British women's literature of World War I

References

Further reading

External links
Official website

1999 establishments in England
Book publishing companies of the United Kingdom
Publishing companies based in London
Publishing companies established in 1999